Laura Dahlmeier (born 22 August 1993) is a retired German biathlete. Dahlmeier started in her first world cup races in the 2012/13 season. In 2014, she participated in the Winter Olympics in Sochi. She won a record of five gold medals at the World Championships of 2017. In 2018 she became the first woman to win the biathlon sprint and pursuit in the same Olympics. During her career she has won a total of two golds and one bronze at the Olympics, seven gold medals, three silver medals and five bronze medals at World Championships, one overall World Cup and two discipline World Cup titles. Dahlmeier announced her retirement from competition in May 2019, at the age of 25. In October 2019, she released a children's book.

Career

Biathlon Career

At the 2013 Biathlon Junior World Championships in Obertilliach, Austria, Dahlmeier took three gold medals in the individual, sprint and relay, as well as a silver in the pursuit. Following this, she was selected for the German team in the women's relay at the 2013 Biathlon World Championships: racing in the third leg, she shot clean and overcame a 38 second deficit to hand over with Germany in the lead. Dahlmeier completed her first full World Cup campaign the following season: she enjoyed further success in World Cup relays, however she was unable to secure a solo podium finish, and did not make an impact at the 2014 Winter Olympics in Sochi, Russia.

Dahlmeier's start to her 2014–15 season was delayed due to injury, and she made her World Cup season debut at Pokljuka in December 2014. Two months later she took her first World Cup win in Nové Město na Moravě, following which she took another six podiums, including a second win, and her first two senior World Championship medals, a silver in the pursuit and a gold in the women's relay. 

In 2015–16 she took five World Cup wins, and at the World Championships in Oslo she took her first solo gold medal in the pursuit along with a silver in the mass start and bronzes in the sprint, individual and women's relay.

Dahlmeier enjoyed her best season in 2016–17, winning the overall World Cup and winning five golds and a silver at the World Championships in Hochfilzen, Austria, missing out on a sixth gold by four seconds in the sprint to Gabriela Koukalová. She became the first woman in biathlon history to win five gold medals at a World Championships. 

The following season Dahlmeier's focus was on the 2018 Winter Olympics in Pyeongchang: at the Games she became the second German woman to take the Olympic gold in the sprint, shooting clean as one of only three competitors to hit all targets in windy conditions, before doubling up with a second title in the pursuit and additionally taking a bronze in the individual.

Dahlmeier's 2018–19 season was disrupted by illness, however she took a World Cup race win at Antholz in January 2019 before going on to take two bronzes at the 2019 World Championships in Östersund in the sprint and the pursuit. After the end of the season, in May 2019 she announced her retirement from competition, stating that she no longer feels the 100% passion necessary for professional biathlon.

Post-Biathlon Career

On 18 October 2019, Dahlmeier released the children's book Die Klima Gang: Laura Dahlmeier und Freunde im Einsatz für die Natur, which she co-authored. 

For the 2019-2020 Biathlon World Cup season, she served as an expert commentator for the German broadcaster ZDF.

Since retiring from competitive biathlon Dahlmeier has competed in mountain running. In June 2019 she won the 39-kilometer Basetrail XL race of the Zugspitz Ultratrail in Grainau, Germany. In September 2019 she won and set a new women's course record in the 52-kilometer Karwandelmarsch race from Scharnitz to Pertisau in Austria. In November of that year she placed 27th at the 2019 World Long Distance Mountain Running Championships in Argentina.

Biathlon results
All results are sourced from the International Biathlon Union. On 17 May 2019, she announced her retirement from biathlon.

Olympic Games
3 medals (2 gold, 1 bronze)

*The mixed relay was added as an event in 2014.

World Championships
15 medals (7 gold, 3 silver, 5 bronze)

*During Olympic seasons competitions are only held for those events not included in the Olympic program.
**The single mixed relay was added as an event in 2019.

Junior World Championships

European Youth Olympic Winter Festival

World Cup

Individual victories
 22 victories – (4 , 11 , 3 , 4 ) 

*Results are from IBU races which include the Biathlon World Cup, Biathlon World Championships and the Winter Olympic Games.

Relay victories

Overall record

* Results in IBU World Cup races, Olympics and World Championships.

References

External links
 
 

1993 births
Living people
Biathletes at the 2014 Winter Olympics
Biathletes at the 2018 Winter Olympics
Olympic biathletes of Germany
Olympic gold medalists for Germany
Olympic bronze medalists for Germany
Olympic medalists in biathlon
Medalists at the 2018 Winter Olympics
German female biathletes
Sportspeople from Garmisch-Partenkirchen
Biathlon World Championships medalists
21st-century German women